The Breezy Hill Site (RI-957) is a prehistoric archaeological site in Foster, Rhode Island.  Finds at the site have been dated to 500–1000 AD, and included dentate stamped pottery fragments.

The site was added to the National Register of Historic Places in 1985.

See also
National Register of Historic Places listings in Providence County, Rhode Island

References

Foster, Rhode Island
National Register of Historic Places in Providence County, Rhode Island
Archaeological sites on the National Register of Historic Places in Rhode Island